Aitken Hutchison (24 November 1948 – 9 August 2021) was a Scottish actor.

Life and career
Hutchison played roles in many episodes of Play for Today from 1970 to 1980, such as in "Just a Boys' Game". Hutchison played Norman Scutt in the Sam Peckinpah film Straw Dogs (1971) where he was the most shady in the group of nefarious local thugs antagonizing Dustin Hoffman's character and especially his ingenue wife played by Susan George. Fellow actress Sally Thomsett described Hutchison as "A fun-loving rogue."

Hutchison co-starred with Robert Mitchum in one of his few protagonist roles in The Wrath of God (1972) where The New York Times observed the performance of "the fine Ken Hutchison". In 1975, he appeared as Vincent Vaughn in an episode of the police drama  The Sweeney entitled  "Stay Lucky, Eh?" This was followed in 1978 when he appeared in the second of the big screen spin offs Sweeney 2 as Hill, the leader of an uncompromising gang of armed robbers.

In 1980, he appeared as Brickett in the episode "National Pelmet", the series 2 opener of the TV drama Minder. He played a supporting role in the 1981 historical miniseries Masada, starring Peter O'Toole. He had a minor role as a police sergeant in the Oscar winning motion picture Gandhi (1982). He appeared as the lead villain's henchman in the 1985 medieval fantasy film Ladyhawke directed by Richard Donner.

Hutchison was the titular Mac Murphy in the ITV children's drama Murphy's Mob in which he played the manager of fictional Third Division football club Dunmore United. The series ran from 1982 to 1985.

From 1990 to 1999, he appeared in multiple roles in the British police television series The Bill. In 1991, he starred as the protagonist's father in the movie Blonde Fist. In 1993, he had a starring role as a private tutor of a gifted young man in the film As an Eilean.

Hutchison died on 9 August 2021, at the age of 72.

Selected filmography
 Groupie Girl (1970) as Colin
 Julius Caesar (1970) as Plebeian (uncredited)
 Straw Dogs (1971) as Norman Scutt 
 The Wrath of God (1972) as Emmet Keogh
 Deadly Strangers (1975) as Jim Nicholls
 Space:1999 The Séance Spectre  (1976)  as Sanderson
 Sweeney 2 (1978) as Hill
 Wuthering Heights (1978) (BBC TV serial) as Heathcliff
 All Quiet on the Western Front (1979) as Hammacher
 Masada (1981) as Fronto
 A Captain's Tale (1982) as Jimmy Dickerson
 Gandhi (1982) as Police Sergeant
 Ladyhawke (1985) as Captain Marquet
 Blonde Fist (1991) as John O'Dowd
 As an Eilean (1993) as MacAlasdair

References

External links

1948 births
2021 deaths
Scottish male film actors
People from Leslie, Fife
20th-century Scottish male actors
Scottish male television actors